Xiphiacetus is an extinct genus of cetacean known from the Miocene (early Burdigalian to late Tortonian,  of Europe and the U.S. East Coast.

 described Priscodelphinus cristatus based on partial and poorly preserved skulls with extremely long and narrow rostra with a huge number of densely packed teeth. He also found a series of well-preserved cervicals and a few of the anterior-most thoracics.

 described Eurhindelphis bossi based on an almost complete skull missing ear bones, both mandibles, sixteen vertebrae, ten ribs, an incomplete scapula, a humerus, and a partial sternum.  Kellogg named his species after its discoverer, Norman H. Boss, who had discovered the type specimen in 1918.  Kellogg also described several other fossils.

 recombined these two taxa and placed them under the generic name Xiphiacetus.

References

Notes

Sources

 
 
 

Miocene cetaceans
Prehistoric toothed whales
Prehistoric cetacean genera
Extinct mammals of Europe
Burdigalian first appearances
Tortonian extinctions